Băișoara is a commune in Cluj County, Transylvania, Romania. It is composed of nine villages: Băișoara, Frăsinet, Moara de Pădure, Muntele Băișorii (Bányahavas), Muntele Bocului (Bikalathavas), Muntele Cacovei (Havastelep), Muntele Filii (Felsőfülehavas), Muntele Săcelului (Asszonyfalvahavas) and Săcel (Havasasszonyfalva).

Since 2000, following important improvements of the local infrastructure it was officially declared a winter sports resort.

Demographics 
According to the census from 2002 there was a total population of 2,330 people living in this town. Of this population, 97.51% are ethnic Romanians, 1.67% ethnic Romani and 0.72% are ethnic Hungarians.

Natives
Victor Felea

References 

Communes in Cluj County
Localities in Transylvania
Ski areas and resorts in Romania